Fritz Magnussen (13 September 1878 – 14 April 1920) was a Danish film director and screenwriter of the silent era. He directed more than 20 films between 1915 and 1919. He is known for Dommens dag (1918), Skæbnesvangre vildfarelser (1918) and Guldspindeln (1916).

Selected filmography
 In the Hour of Trial (1915 - wrote)
 The Sea Vultures (1916 - wrote)

External links

1878 births
1920 deaths
Danish film directors
Danish male screenwriters
20th-century screenwriters
Film directors from Copenhagen